Nightwatch is the second studio album by American singer-songwriter Kenny Loggins, released in 1978. The album is Loggins' highest charting album on the Billboard 200 to date, reaching number 7.

The lead single, "Whenever I Call You 'Friend'" featuring Fleetwood Mac's Stevie Nicks (co-written with Melissa Manchester), reached number 5 on the Billboard Hot 100.  The second and final single, "Easy Driver", peaked at number 60 in early 1979.  This album also featured the first released version of the Doobie Brothers' "What a Fool Believes", which Loggins co-wrote with the Doobies' Michael McDonald.

Most of the artists on this album represent Loggins' original band from 1977 to 1980.

Track listing

Side One
 "Nightwatch" (music: Kenny Loggins, Max Gronenthal; lyrics: Kenny Loggins, Dan Loggins) − 7:49 
 "Easy Driver" (David Plenn, Jerry Riopelle) − 3:33 
 "Down 'N' Dirty" (music: Kenny Loggins, Brian Mann; lyrics: Kenny Loggins, Eva Ein) − 4:42 
 "Down in the Boondocks" (Joe South) − 4:20

Side Two
 "Whenever I Call You 'Friend'" (music: Kenny Loggins; lyrics: Kenny Loggins, Melissa Manchester) − 3:57 (Duet with Stevie Nicks)
 "Wait a Little While" (music: Kenny Loggins, lyrics: Kenny Loggins, Eva Ein) − 3:55 
 "What a Fool Believes" (Kenny Loggins, Michael McDonald) − 3:37 
 "Somebody Knows" (Kenny Loggins) − 3:34
 "Angelique" (music: Kenny Loggins; lyrics: Kenny Loggins, Eva Ein) − 5:53

Charts

Personnel 
 Kenny Loggins listed as "Ken Loggins" – lead and backing vocals, guitars
 Mike Hamilton – guitars, backing vocals
 Brian Mann – keyboards
 George Hawkins – bass guitar, backing vocals
 Tris Imboden – drums, harmonica
 Jon Clarke – horns, woodwinds
 Vince Denham – horns
 Bob James – string arrangements
 Stevie Nicks – lead and backing vocals on "Whenever I Call You Friend"

Production 
 Producer – Bob James 
 Engineers – Joe Jorgensen and John Pace
 Recorded at Sound Mixers (New York City, NY)
 Cover concept – David Alexander and Kenny Loggins
 Photography – David Alexander
 Design – Merrilyn Romen

Cover versions
Al Jarreau covered "Wait a Little While" on his 1978 album All Fly Home.
The Doobie Brothers recorded "What a Fool Believes" on their 1978 album Minute by Minute.

References

1978 albums
Kenny Loggins albums
Albums produced by Bob James (musician)
Columbia Records albums